Turks and Caicos Islands national basketball team represents the Turks and Caicos Islands in international competitions. It is administrated by the Turks and Caicos Islands Basketball Federation.

Turks and Caicos Islands joined the International Federation of Basketball (FIBA) in 2002 and is the world's second youngest member.

Despite the Turks and Caicos Islands's very small population, its basketball team once qualified for the Caribbean Basketball Championship. At this event, the team played against competition from countries such as Jamaica or Cuba, which have more than sixty times the Turks and Caicos Islands's population size.

Roster
Team that competed at the 2004 Caribbean Basketball Championship: (last publicized squad)

Competitions

Performance at FIBA AmeriCup
yet to qualify

Performance at Caribbean Championship
2004 : 7th
2006 : –  
2007 : –
2009 : –
2011 : –

References

External links
Presentation at CaribbeanBasketball.com
Archived records of the Turks and Caicos Islands team participations

Basketball in the Turks and Caicos Islands
Basketball teams in the Turks and Caicos Islands
Men's national basketball teams
Basketball
2002 establishments in the Turks and Caicos Islands